Sarıgüney is a village in the Çayırlı District, Erzincan Province, Turkey. The village had a population of 67 in 2021.

The hamlet of Patuklugelengeçi is attached to the village.

References 

Villages in Çayırlı District